Hannes Lintl (2 July 1924 – 13 June 2003) was an Austrian architect, best known for designing the Donauturm (Danube Tower, 1964), part of the Viennese skyline and a popular lookout point and tourist attraction.

Hannes-Lintl-Gasse, a street in Vienna’s twenty-second district, is named after him.

Timeline
1948 Academy of Applied Arts Vienna, awarded the Josef Hoffmann Prize
1952 Academy of Fine Arts Vienna, studying under Prof. C. Holzmeister
1957 Receives his Ziviltechnikerbefugnis (licence) and opens his architectural firm
1966 Gold Medal for Architecture of the City of Vienna
1967 Appointment as Jordanian Consul General in Austria
1969 Awarded the title of Professor by Franz Jonas, the President of Austria
2000 Awarded the Austrian Cross of Honour for Science and Art, 1st class
 Grand Decoration of Honour in Silver for Services to the Republic of Austria
 Grand Cordon of the Order of Independence (Jordan) (Al Istiqlal)

Projects
This list includes finished projects with a total cost exceeding €10,900,000 (150 million schillings) each. ARGE stands for Arbeitsgemeinschaft, or "working group".

Schools and other educational institutions
 Höhere Technische Lehranstalt, Innsbruck
 Bundesgymnasium & Bundesrealgymnasium, Pichelmayergasse, Vienna
 Bundesrealgymnasium Leibnitz
 Bundesrealgymnasium Zwettl
 Bildungshaus Neuwaldegg, Vienna
 Medizintechnische Schule im AKH, Vienna
 Zentralberufsschule für KFZ-Mechanik, Scheydgasse, Vienna
 Addition to the Wirtschaftsförderungsinstitut, Währinger Gürtel, Vienna (ARGE)
 Volksschule und Sonderpädagogisches Zentrum, Hammerfestweg, Vienna

Office buildings
 Saudi Electricity Company, Jeddah, Saudi Arabia
 Palais Grassalkovics, Wiener Fremdenverkehrsverband ("Vienna Tourism Association"), Obere Augartenstraße, Vienna
 Büro- und Wohnhaus, Obere Donaustraße 21, Vienna
 Zentralanstalt der Pensionsversicherung der Angestellten, Vienna (ARGE)
 Erweiterung Wirtschaftskammer Österreich, Wiener Hauptstrasse, Vienna
 IBM, Lassallestraße, Vienna (ARGE)
 Bank Austria, Lassallestraße, Vienna (ARGE)
 Donau-Business-Center, Handelskai 388, Vienna
 Zürich Kosmos, Lassallestraße, Vienna

Hospitals, medical centres, and aged care facilities
 Allgemeines Krankenhaus, Vienna (ARGE)
 Krankenhaus Zell am See, Salzburg
 Neurochirurgische Universitätsklinik im AKH, Vienna
 AUVA Rehabilitationszentrum Weißer Hof, Klosterneuburg (ARGE)
 AUVA Rehabilitationszentrum Tobelbad, Styria (ARGE)
 Heim für betagte Menschen, Breitenfurterstraße, Vienna
 Seniorenwohnheim Wohnstift Augustinum, Kurpark Oberlaa, Vienna (ARGE)

Industrial buildings 
 Three power stations for the Saudi Electric Company in Jeddah, Mecca and Ta'if, Saudi Arabia
 Siemens Werk für Elektronikfertigung, Weißgerberlände, Vienna
 Addition to the Porzellanmanufaktur Augarten, Vienna

Shopping centres
 Modezentrum Boecker, Vienna
 Generali Centre, Vienna (ARGE)
 Zentrum Simmering, Vienna
 Ringstraßen-Galerien, Kärntnerring, Vienna (ARGE)

Housing estates
 Wohnhausanlage Arsenal, Vienna
 Wohnhausanlage Oswald Redlich-Straße, Vienna
 Personalwohnhaus UKH Meidling, Vienna

Hotels
 Addition to the Zürserhof, Zürs am Arlberg
 Corso Grand Hotel, Kärntnerring, Vienna (ARGE)

Representative buildings
 Indonesian Embassy, Vienna
 Raghadan Palace, Amman, Jordan

Telecommunications buildings
 Television Production Centre, Amman, Jordan

Miscellaneous
 Donauturm, Vienna
 St. John's Beacon, Liverpool
 Baghdad Television Tower, Iraq (destroyed during war)
 Jakarta Bung Karno Tower, Indonesia (project abandoned)
 Montreal Television Tower, Canada (design only)
 Ausbildungs- und Einsatzzentrale des Einsatzkommandos COBRA, New Vienna

References

External links 
 Lintl's architectural firm, now run by Christian Lintl

1924 births
2003 deaths
20th-century Austrian architects
Architects from Vienna
Academy of Fine Arts Vienna alumni

Recipients of the Austrian Cross of Honour for Science and Art, 1st class
Recipients of the Grand Decoration for Services to the Republic of Austria
Grand Cordons of the Order of Independence (Jordan)